Kostajnica can refer to:

 Kostajnica, Bosnia and Herzegovina (formerly Bosanska Kostajnica), a town on the right bank of river Una, in Bosnia
 Hrvatska Kostajnica, a town on the left bank of river Una, in Croatia
 Kostajnica, Doboj, a village near Doboj, Bosnia and Herzegovina
 Kostajnica, Konjic, a village near Konjic, Bosnia and Herzegovina

See also
 Kostanjica, a village in the municipality of Kotor, Montenegro
 Koštanjica (Bar Municipality), Montenegro